Abya Yala, which in the Kuna language means "land in its full maturity" or "land of vital blood", is the name used by the  Native American Guna people who inhabit the geographic region called the Darién Gap, between what is now northwest Colombia and southeast Panama, to refer to the American continent since Pre-Columbian times. The term is now used by Indigenous movements across the American continent.

Origin and usage 
The Bolivian Aymara leader Takir Mamani argues for the use of the term "Abya Yala" in the official declarations of indigenous peoples' governing bodies, saying that "placing foreign names on our villages, our cities, and our continents is equivalent to subjecting our identity to the will of our invaders and their heirs." Thus, use of the term "Abya Yala" rather than a term such as New World or America may have ideological implications indicating support for indigenous rights.

A publishing house in Ecuador, Editorial Abya Yala, chose its name according to Takir Mamani's suggestion. The name has also been used by an independent theater in Costa Rica, Teatro Abya Yala, and by a San Francisco video production and web design firm, Abya-Yala Productions.

A similar term referring to the northern part of the continent  is Turtle Island, which is used by several Northeastern Woodland Native American tribes, especially the Haudenosaunee or Iroquois Confederacy, for part of the continent.

An anthology titled "Turtle Island to Abya Yala," featuring 60 Native American and Latina women artists and poets, had raised startup funding on Kickstarter as of 2011.

The musical artists Combo Chimbita named their debut full length album Abya Yala.

See also 
 Guna Yala is the name of the autonomous Guna region in Panama.
 Turtle Island, a similar term referring to the continent of North America.

References

External links 
 Abya-Yala Fussion Folklorica Latinoamericana
 Abya Yala Net (en.)

Indigenous peoples of Central America
Kuna people